Hariana is a town and a municipal council in Hoshiarpur district in the Indian state of Punjab.
It is about 100 km from Amritsar International Airport.
Hariana is named after Guru Hari Sen, the guru of the singer Tansen.

Demographics
 India census, Hariana had a population of 7813. Males constitute 52% of the population and females 48%. Hariana has an average literacy rate of 76%, higher than the national average of 59.5%: male literacy is 79%, and female literacy is 73%. In Hariana, 11% of the population is under 6 years of age.

References
   
    

Cities and towns in Hoshiarpur district